Godland is an internationally coproduced drama film directed by Hlynur Pálmason and released in 2022. Set in the late 19th century, the film stars Elliott Crosset Hove as Lucas, a Lutheran priest from Denmark who is sent to Iceland to oversee the establishment of a new parish church, only to have his faith tested and challenged by the harsh conditions of rural life, including his inability as a monolingual Danish-language speaker to communicate with his assigned Icelandic guide, Ragnar (Ingvar Eggert Sigurðsson).

The film premiered in the Un Certain Regard program at the 2022 Cannes Film Festival and had its North American premiere at the 2022 Toronto International Film Festival.

Plot
In the late nineteenth century, Danish priest Lucas is tasked with traveling to Iceland (which at the time was a remote Danish territory) and building a church in a Danish settlement. He takes a camera to document the land and travels by boat with several Icelandic laborers and a translator (Hilmar Guðjónsson), who is Lucas's only ally and connection to the rest of the group. When they arrive, they meet their guide, Ragnar, who harbors a distrust of Danes.

While traveling, the group encounters a deep and raging river that, despite Ragnar's warnings, Lucas insists they ford. Both the translator and a large cross fall off his horses, and the translator drowns. They bury him in a shallow grave that is soon unearthed by the rising tide. Grief-stricken Lucas becomes withdrawn and sullen, praying for God to allow him to return to Denmark. He faints from exhaustion and falls off his horse into a ravine and nearly dies and the group carries on without him. Later, the group is shown to have arrived at the settlement where Lucas is nursed back to health by a man named Carl and his daughters, Anna and Ida.

The village comes together to build the church and celebrates occasions within it. When a couple marries, Lucas refuses to perform the ceremony when the church is yet unfinished. During the wedding reception, traditional wrestling games are played and Carl chooses to go against Lucas, who wins and is then made to fight Ragnar, where palpable tension is felt. 

As Lucas befriends Ida and develops an attraction to Anna, his horse goes missing and is later found dead. When the church is completed, Ragnar finds Lucas outside the village and requests that a photo of him be taken before he leaves, but Lucas refuses and insults him. Ragnar reveals that he does in fact speak Danish and has done many evil things, including leaving Lucas to die and killing his horse. He asks for Lucas' prayers. Instead, Lucas snaps and attacks him, bashing Ragnar's head against the rocks and killing him. Lucas returns to Anna and discards his camera equipment, and the two have sex. Carl warns Anna not to get involved with Lucas any further because he believes Lucas to be a feeble and foolish man.

During Lucas' first service in the finished church, Ragnar's dog interrupts by continuously barking outside. When he goes out to quiet it, he slips in mud and dirties his robes and face. The dog's presence spooks him and he steals one of Ida's horses and flees. Carl pursues him despite Anna's request that he not harm Lucas. Carl catches up to him and surprises Lucas by stabbing him to death, saying that everyone will believe he simply fell off the horse. Some time later, Ida finds Lucas' skeleton and tearfully tells him that he will soon be part of nature.

Cast and characters
 Elliott Crosset Hove as Lucas
 Ingvar Eggert Sigurðsson as Ragnar
 Jacob Lohmann as Carl
 Vic Carmen Sonne as Anna
 Ída Mekkín Hlynsdóttir as Ida

Wet plate photographs
In the opening of the film, a title card states:

However, these images never existed. Hlynur invented the story to help inspire the filmmaking process. As part of filming, several wet plate photographs were taken, one of which was used for the film's poster.

Reception
On the review aggregator Rotten Tomatoes, the film has a 88% approval rating from critics based on 17 reviews, with an average rating of 8.1/10. On Metacritic, the film has an average score of 79 out of 100 based on 6 reviews, indicating "generally favorable reviews".

Awards
The film was selected as Denmark's 2022 submission for the Nordic Council Film Prize.

References

External links
 

2022 films
2022 drama films
Icelandic drama films
Danish drama films
Swedish drama films
French drama films
2020s Icelandic-language films
2020s Danish-language films
Films directed by Hlynur Pálmason
2020s French films
2022 multilingual films
Icelandic multilingual films
Danish multilingual films
Swedish multilingual films
French multilingual films